The House That Screamed, also released as The Boarding School, is a 1969 Spanish horror film written and directed by Narciso Ibáñez Serrador. The film stars Lilli Palmer as Señora Fourneau, the headmistress of a nineteenth-century French boarding school for girls where the students begin to disappear under unusual circumstances.

Plot
In a 19th-century French boarding school for troubled girls, Headmistress Señora Fourneau (Lilli Palmer) forbids her teenage son Luis (John Moulder-Brown) from going near any of the girls, finding none of them good enough for him. Eighteen-year-old Teresa Garan (Cristina Galbó) arrives at the school to be enrolled, and notices odd occurrences at the boarding school from the moment of her arrival, specifically the sense of being watched or followed.

Señora Forneau, a strict disciplinarian, abuses the unruly students by means of beatings and flagellation, with the help of Irene Tupan (Mary Maude), a senior student whom she has taken as a protégé. When one of the girls goes missing one night, Irene is blamed by Señora Forneau for not keeping close account of the keys that allow entry in and out of the school. Meanwhile, Teresa begins a romance with Luis, but grows increasingly unnerved by the atmosphere of the school and the multiple disappearances of students. She is also bullied by her peers, who torment her because of her mother's past as a prostitute.

In the middle of the night, Teresa plans an escape. Irene awakens to her leaving, and rushes outside to the gate, hoping to stop her. Teresa first goes to say goodbye to Luis, who gives her money from his savings to help her with travel expenses. As Teresa attempts to break out of a window downstairs, she is attacked and has her throat slashed. Irene returns to the school later and finds the windowsill in the parlor soaked with rainwater from the storm. Irene confronts Señora Fourneau, insisting that Teresa could not have escaped; she also tells her she plans to leave the school, and will blackmail Fourneau over her abuses if necessary. Fourneau forces Irene to hand over her keys.

Later that evening, Señora Fourneau catches Irene attempting to escape, and follows her as she flees upstairs, eventually hiding in the attic. Señora Fourneau ascends to the attic, where she finds Irene stabbed to death, and her hands severed from her body. In a secret chamber of the attic, Señora Fourneau finds her son with a corpse made up of various female body parts. Señora Fournea realizes Luis' frustrated desires have forced psychotic urges to the surface, compelling him to stalk the hapless girls to acquire body parts in order to create his own "ideal woman". Luis then locks up his mother in the room with his new creation so that she can get acquainted with her future "daughter-in-law".

Cast
 Lilli Palmer as Señora Fourneau
 Cristina Galbó as Teresa Garan
 John Moulder-Brown as Luis Fourneau
 Mary Maude as Irene Tupan
 Maribel Martín as Isabel   
 Cándida Losada as Señorita Despez
 Pauline Challoner as Catalina
 Tomás Blanco as Pedro Baldie
 Víctor Israel as Brechard
 Teresa Hurtado as Andrea
 María José Valero as Elena
 Conchita Paredes as Susana
 Ana María Pol as Claudia
 Mari Carmen Duque as Julia
 Paloma Pagés as Cecelia

Production
La residencia was director Narciso Ibáñez Serrador's first horror film and produced by Javier Armet through his company Anabel Films The screenplay is based on a story by Juan Tébar. Serrador wrote the screenplay under the name "Luis Penafiel."

The film was created as a commercial film with the express purpose of breaking into the international market, Filming took place in Comillas, Cantabria, Spain. Because the film was made up of both English and Spanish actors, the film was shot with the actors performing in both English and Spanish languages. The film was dubbed entirely in English in post-production, making it the first Spanish film presented in English.

Release
The film was released in Spain in December 1969.

It later received a theatrical release in the United States as The House That Screamed on July 21, 1971 through American International Pictures. In the United States, the film was given a GP rating by the Motion Picture Association of America. In an issue of Filmfacts published in 1971, it was noted: "That The House That Screamed should receive a mild 'GP' rating is ironic proof that there lingers in some minds a crazy kind of puritanical logic, the evils of which are so morbidly epitomized in this grisly horror film." The film was a financial success in Spain, becoming the highest-grossing movie in Spain up that time, grossing 45 million Spanish pesetas (roughly $640,000 U.S. dollars at the time) in its first six months and more than one million dollars by the end of the year

Director Narciso Ibáñez Serrador did not appreciate how the film had been promoted, stating that it was "terribly promoted, promoted with clichés". The film was released by American International Pictures in the United States and did not do well with contemporary American audiences.

Critical opinion
The film was released in Spain to very mixed reviews. Antonio Pelayo of Cinestudio wrote a review questioning the budget of the film, stating that other Spanish directors could have produced "at least two films of the same technical standard". Pérez Gómez of Reseña wrote a positive review, stating that the film was "respectable commercial cinema." Miguel Marías of Nuestro Cine found the film disrespectful to cinema and audiences, stating that financial support for such films that "insult her/him, and consider her/him a retard whose subnormality needs to be fed". Marías also critiqued film critics who supported the film.

Film scholars have compared the film's narrative to that of Psycho (1960), and have noted its "Oedipal and Sadean overtones."

Home media
The film was released on DVD as part of the Shout! Factory Double Feature series, where it was paired with Maneater of Hydra. As with other releases in the series, the movie is viewable both with and without the Elvira commentary.

On December 27, 2016, the film was released on Blu-ray by Shout! Factory in North America. The release features the U.S. theatrical cut of the film, as well as an extended cut.

Notes

Sources

External links

1969 films
1969 horror films
1960s slasher films
English-language Spanish films
Films about child abuse
Films about educators
Films about sexual repression
Films set in France
Films set in the 19th century
Spanish historical horror films
Spanish slasher films
Spanish horror thriller films
Films set in boarding schools
1960s historical horror films
Spanish historical thriller films
Period horror films
1960s Spanish films